Anacithara axialis is an extinct species of sea snail, a marine gastropod mollusk in the family Horaiclavidae.

Description

Distribution
This extinct marine species occurred off New Zealand

References

 Marshall, Patrick. "The Tertiary molluscan fauna of Pakaurangi Point, Kaipara Harbour." Transactions and Proceedings of the New Zealand Institute. Vol. 50. 1918.
 Maxwell, P.A. (2009). Cenozoic Mollusca. pp. 232–254 in Gordon, D.P. (ed.) New Zealand inventory of biodiversity. Volume one. Kingdom Animalia: Radiata, Lophotrochozoa, Deuterostomia. Canterbury University Press, Christchurch.

External links

axialis
Gastropods of New Zealand
Gastropods described in 1918